Rhonda S. Taylor (born September 4, 1965) is an American politician from Georgia. Taylor is a Democratic member of Georgia House of Representatives for District 91.

References

Democratic Party members of the Georgia House of Representatives
21st-century American politicians
Living people
21st-century American women politicians
Women state legislators in Georgia (U.S. state)
1965 births